Mercedes-Benz Mobility AG (formerly Daimler Financial Services and Daimler Mobility) is the global financial and mobility services provider of the Mercedes-Benz Group. The company finances, leases and insures Daimler Group passenger cars and commercial vehicles, optimizes fleets of commercial customers and offers  banking and credit/debit cards services in more than 40 countries.

Additionally, a key part of today's business is its mobility services with more than 70 million users registered for the company's mobility services.

Mercedes-Benz Mobility is based in Stuttgart, with more than 12,000 employees (2019). The total value of all financing and leasing contracts managed by the company exceeds €154 billion as of 2018.

See also
 FREENOW
car2go

References

External links
Official site

 
Financial services companies established in 1990